"Chizhyk-Pyzhik" is a Russian satirical folk song which runs as follows:

Чижик-пыжик, где ты был?
На Фонтанке водку пил.
Выпил рюмку, выпил две –
Закружилось в голове.

Chizhik-Pyzhik, gdje ty byl?
Na fontankje vodku pil.
Vypil rjumku, vypil dvje –
Zakruzhilosj v golovje.

Chizhik-Pyzhik, where've you been?
Drank vodka on the Fontanka.
Took a shot, took another –
Got dizzy.

The origin of the song in unclear. According to one urban legend, the rhyme refers to the students of the Imperial School of Jurisprudence, who frequented a pub belonging to the merchant Nefedov on the Fontanka Quay in Saint Petersburg. The school was founded by Duke Peter of Oldenburg in the nearby house #6. The students of the college wore uniforms with yellow and green colors, which resembled the colors of the bird called the siskin (chizh; hypocoristic: , chizhik), and hats from fur of young reindeer (pyzhik). Because of that, they were nicknamed Chizhiks-Pyzhiks.

Its extremely simple melody (mi-do-mi-do-fa-mi-RE, sol-sol-sol-(la-ti)-do-do-DO) is suitable for teaching small children to play piano (with a suitable "nursery" lyrics).

Several Russian classical composers, including Sergey Prokofyev, Isaak Dunaevsky and Rimsky-Korsakov, were inspired with Chizhik.

Statue 
In 1994 in Saint Petersburg was held one of the city's 1990s' yearly festivals of satire and humor , bearing the name of a most popular main character of the 20 century Russian language Soviet humorous / satirical prose Ostap Bender, an ingenious conman mastermind from two filmed novels by Ilya Il'f and Evgeniy Petrov The 12 Chairs and The Little Golden Calf. The festival attracted leading Russian humorous authors and comedians and marked its presence in the city by public events including installation of pieces of public art. These over the years included the statue of Ostap Bender next to Arts Square, the memorial plaque to The Nose from Nicholai Gogol's eponymous story and the little siskin statue on the Fontanka, the latter suggested by a Saint Petersburg-born writer known since 1960s Andrei Bitov. These moves were supported by the municipal authorities of St. Petersburg, and a bronze statue of Chizhik-Pyzhik was installed just opposite the former School of Jurisprudence. The statue perches on a ledge in the embankment, in the proximity of the First Engineer Bridge.

The statue was designed by Georgian screenwriter and director Revaz Gabriadze, and it is one of the smallest statues in Saint Petersburg. Its height is 11 centimeters and weight about 5 kilograms.

The statue was stolen on at least three occasions, the last time in 2003, obviously for the purpose of its subsequent remelting. This prompted the city authorities to toy with the idea of replacing it with a statue made of granite or marble, which would make thefts less lucrative.

See also
Čížečku, čížečku

References 

 Chizhik-Pyzhik article on St. Petersburg tourist information site

Russian folklore
Russian folk songs
Russian children's songs
Traditional children's songs
Songs about birds
Outdoor sculptures in Russia
1994 sculptures
Russian nursery rhymes